The Communist Party ( / , KP) was a communist party from Bosnia and Herzegovina. It was formed in February 2012 and merged in April with the League of Communists of Banja Luka.

The KP took part in the general elections of 2014. It candidated for the House of Representatives winning 5051 votes (0.31%) and no seats.

See also
Workers' Communist Party of Bosnia and Herzegovina

References

2012 establishments in Bosnia and Herzegovina
Communist parties in Bosnia and Herzegovina
Democratic socialist parties in Europe
Political parties established in 2012